Live at 5:30 may refer to: 

Live at 5:30 (Canadian TV program), a CP24 newscast serving the Greater Toronto market
Live @ 5:30, a talk show on CHCH Hamilton hosted by Mark Hebscher and Donna Skelly

See also
Live at Five (disambiguation)